The Zotye T600 is a mid-size CUV produced by Zotye Auto.

Overview
The production car debuted in December 2013.  Pricing of the T600 ranges from 79,800 yuan to 98,800 yuan. The Zotye T600 is controversial in terms of styling as the styling of the body heavily resembles the Audi Q5, with the front DRG inspired by the Volkswagen Touareg. Initial launch only made the 1.5L turbocharged petrol engine I4 available, and the 2.0L turbocharged petrol engine I4 was only available starting from 2015.

2018 facelift
As of 2018, all other T600 variants were discontinued with only the T600 Coupe model remains to be on sale with the name changing to simply T600 and the front and rear end redesigned to adopt to the rest of the Zotye crossover family. An updated T600 with 1.6L turbo engine mated to 6-speed automatic is planned to be the first Zotye vehicle to be sold in the United States, from 2020.

Zotye T600 Sport
The new Zotye T600 Sport was revealed to the Chinese car market in May 2016. Pricing ranges from 95,800 yuan to 149,800 yuan, making the T600 Sport the high end variant of the base model Zotye T600 SUV.

Zotye T600 Coupe
The Zotye T600 Coupe is based on the Zotye T600. Just like the T600 Sport, the T600 Coupe is also a sportier and higher trim version of the T600, but with slight styling differences most notably with a redesigned interior, at the front with new lights, new grilles, and different DLO plus blacked out D-pillars.

References

Notes

External links

 
www.zotye.us

Cars of China
T600 Sport
Crossover sport utility vehicles
Mid-size sport utility vehicles
Front-wheel-drive vehicles
Cars introduced in 2013
Zotye T600 Sport
Zotye T600 Coupe